The 1982 College Football All-America team is composed of college football players who were selected as All-Americans by various organizations and writers that chose College Football All-America Teams in 1982. The National Collegiate Athletic Association (NCAA) recognizes four selectors as "official" for the 1982 season. They are: (1) the American Football Coaches Association (AFCA) based on the input of more than 2,000 voting members; (2) the Associated Press (AP) selected based on the votes of sports writers at AP newspapers; (3) the Football Writers Association of America (FWAA) selected by the nation's football writers; and (4) the United Press International (UPI).  Other selectors included Football News (FN), the Gannett News Service (GNS), the Newspaper Enterprise Association (NEA), The Sporting News (TSN), and the Walter Camp Football Foundation (WC).

Thirteen players were unanimously selected as first-team All-Americans by all four official selectors. They were:

 Jim Arnold, punter for Vanderbilt
 Anthony Carter, wide receiver for Michigan, consensus first-team All-American in both 1981 and 1982 and the 1982 winner of the Chicago Tribune Silver Football as the Most Valuable Player in the Big Ten Conference
 Eric Dickerson, running back for SMU who rushed for 1,617	yards in 1982
 John Elway, quarterback for Stanford, the 1982 recipient of the Sammy Baugh Trophy
 Gordon Hudson, tight end for BYU
 Terry Kinard, defensive back for Clemson, a consensus All-American in both 1981 and 1982 and the CBS National Defensive Player of the Year in 1982
 Steve Korte, offensive lineman for Arkansas
 Don Mosebar, offensive lineman for USC
 Chuck Nelson, placekicker for Washington
 Dave Rimington, center for Nebraska, two-time winner of the Outland Trophy and the namesake of the Rimington Trophy, which is awarded annually to the nation's top collegiate center
 Herschel Walker, running back for Georgia, a three-time consensus first-team All-American who finished second in the Heisman Trophy voting in 1981 and won the award in 1982
 Billy Ray Smith Jr., defensive end for Arkansas and who was a consensus first-team All-American in both 1981 and 1982
 Darryl Talley, linebacker for West Virginia

Consensus All-Americans
The following charts identify the NCAA-recognized consensus All-Americans for the year 1982 and displays which first-team designations they received.

Offense

Defense

Special teams

Offense

Receivers 

 Anthony Carter, Michigan (CFHOF) (AFCA, AP-1, FWAA, UPI-1, GNS-1, NEA, TSN, WC)
 Kenny Jackson, Penn State (AP-1, UPI-2)
 Trumaine Johnson, Grambling (TSN)
 Willie Gault, Tennessee (AP-3, GNS-2, NEA)
 Henry Ellard, Fresno State (AP-2, GNS-1)
 Chris Castor, Duke (AP-2)
 Stanley Washington, TCU (GNS-2)
 Mike Martin, Illinois (AP-3, GNS-3)
 Trumaine Johnson, Grambling (GNS-3)

Tight ends 

 Gordon Hudson, BYU (AFCA, AP-1, FWAA, UPI-1, TSN, WC)
 Tony Hunter, Notre Dame (GNS-2, NEA)
 David Lewis, California (GNS-1)
 Allama Matthews, Vanderbilt (AP-2, UPI-2, FN)
 Darren Long, Long Beach State (AP-3)
 Chris Dressel, Stanford (GNS-3)

Tackles 

 Don Mosebar, Southern California (AFCA, AP-1, FWAA, UPI-1, GNS-2, WC)
 Jimbo Covert, Pittsburgh (CFHOF) (AFCA, FWAA, UPI-1, GNS-1, WC)
 Bill Fralic, Pittsburgh (CFHOF) (AP-1, NEA)
 Harvey Salem, California (AP-2, GNS-2, TSN)
 Chris Hinton, Northwestern (UPI-2, GNS-1, TSN)
 Karl Nelson, Iowa State (NEA)
 Randy Theiss, Nebraska (AP-2)
 Maceo Fifer, Houston (UPI-2)
 Sid Abramowitz, Tulsa (AP-3)
 Robert Oxendine, Duke (AP-3)
 Alfred Mohammad, Arkansas (GNS-3)
 Eric Moran, Washington (GNS-3)

Guards 

 Steve Korte, Arkansas (AFCA, AP-1, FWAA, UPI-1, GNS-1, NEA, TSN)
 Bruce Matthews, USC (AFCA, AP-1, UPI-1, FN, GNS-1, NEA, TSN, WC)
 Dave Drechsler, North Carolina (AP-2, FWAA, UPI-2, WC [tackle])
 Joe Lukens, Ohio State (AP-2, UPI-2)
 Tom Thayer, Notre Dame (GNS-2)
 Jeff Kiewel, Arizona (GNS-2)
 Wayne Harris, Mississippi State (AP-3)
 Dave Schreck, Air Force (AP-3)
 Rob Fada, Pittsburgh (GNS-3)
 Steve Cox, Tulsa (GNS-3)

Centers 

 Dave Rimington, Nebraska (CFHOF)  (AFCA, AP-1, FWAA, UPI-1, GNS-1, NEA, TSN, WC)
 Bart Oates, Brigham Young (AP-2)
 Wayne Radloff, Georgia (UPI-2, GNS-3)
 Robin Ham, West Texas State (GNS-2)
 Tony Slaton, USC (AP-3)

Quarterbacks 

 John Elway, Stanford  (CFHOF)  (AFCA, AP-1, FWAA, UPI-1, FN, GNS-1, NEA, TSN, WC)
 Tom Ramsey, UCLA (AP-2, UPI-2)
 Tony Eason, Illinois (AP-3, GNS-2)
 Doug Flutie, Boston College (CFHOF) (GNS-3)

Running backs 

 Herschel Walker, Georgia (CFHOF) (AFCA, AP-1, FWAA, UPI-1, FN, GNS-1, NEA, TSN, WC)
 Eric Dickerson, SMU (AFCA, AP-1, FWAA, TSN, UPI-1, FN, GNS-1, NEA, WC)
 Mike Rozier, Nebraska CFHOF) (AFCA, AP-2, FWAA, UPI-1, FN, GNS-2)
 Ernest Anderson, Oklahoma State (AP-2, UPI-2, GNS-3, WC)
 Curt Warner, Penn State (UPI-2)
 Tim Spencer, Ohio State (UPI-2)
 James Jones, Florida (GNS-2)
 Marcus Dupree, Oklahoma (AP-3)
 Craig James, SMU (AP-3)
 Mike Gunter, Tulsa (GNS-3)

Defense

Defensive ends 

 Billy Ray Smith, Jr., Arkansas (CFHOF) (AFCA, AP-1, FWAA, UPI-1, GNS-1, NEA [LB], TSN, WC)
 Vernon Maxwell, Arizona State (AFCA, AP-2 [LB], FWAA [LB], UPI-1, GNS-1 [LB], NEA [LB], TSN, WC)
 William Fuller, North Carolina (AP-2 [DT], FWAA)
 Charles Benson, Baylor (AP-2, UPI-2, GNS-1)
 Jody Schulz, East Carolina (AP-3, GNS-2)
 Walker Lee Ashley, Penn State (UPI-2, GNS-3)
 Michael Walter, Oregon (GNS-2)
 Kiki DeAyala, Texas (AP-3)
 Mike Pitts, Alabama (GNS-3)

Defensive tackles 

 Mike Pitts, Alabama (AFCA, FWAA, UPI-1, NEA [DE], TSN)
 Rick Bryan, Oklahoma  (AP-2, FWAA, UPI-1, GNS-2)
 Gabriel Rivera, Texas Tech (CFHOF) (AFCA, AP-1, UPI-2 [MG], GNS-1)
 Mike Charles, Syracuse (FWAA, UPI-2, AP-3)
 Bill Maas, Pittsburgh (TSN)
 Jimmy Payne, Georgia (WC)
 Gary Lewis, Oklahoma State (AP-1, GNS-1)
 Charles Benson, Baylor, (NEA [DE])
 Jim Jeffcoat, Arizona State (GNS-1)
 Mark Bortz, Iowa (UPI-2)
 Andrew Provence, South Carolina (AP-3, GNS-2)
 William Pery, Clemson (AP-3)

Middle guards 

 George Achica, USC (AP-1, UPI-1, GNS-3, NEA, TSN, WC)
 Tim Krumrie, Wisconsin (WC)
 Karl Morgan, UCLA (AP-2)

Linebackers 

 Darryl Talley, West Virginia (CFHOF) (AFCA, AP-1, FWAA, UPI-1, GNS-1, NEA, TSN)
 Marcus Marek, Ohio State (AFCA, AP-2, UPI-1, WC)
 Ricky Hunley, Arizona (CFHOF) (AFCA, AP-1, UPI-1, GNS-2)
 Wilber Marshall, Florida (CFHOF) (AP-1, FWAA, UPI-2, GNS-1)
 Mark Stewart, Washington (AP-1, TSN, WC)
 Tony Caldwell, Washington (NEA)
 Albert Richardson, LSU (AP-2, UPI-2)
 Scott Radecic, Penn State (UPI-2, GNS-1)
 Garin Veris, Stanford (GNS-2)
 Ray Cone, Colorado (GNS-2)
 Darrell Patterson, TCU (GNS-2)
 Johnny Jackson, New Mexico (AP-3)
 Andy Ponselgo, Navy (AP-3)
 Mark Zavagnin, Notre Dame (AP-3)

Defensive backs 

 Terry Kinard, Clemson (AFCA, AP-1, FWAA, UPI-1, GNS-1, NEA, TSN, WC)
 Terry Hoage, Georgia (CFHOF) (AFCA, AP-1, UPI-1, GNS-1, NEA, TSN, WC)
 Mike Richardson, Arizona State (AFCA, AP-1, UPI-1, TSN, WC)
 Mark Robinson, Penn State (AP-3, FWAA, UPI-2, GNS-2, NEA, TSN)
 Tommy Wilcox, Alabama (WC)
 James Britt, LSU (NEA)
 Jeremiah Castille, Alabama (AFCA, AP-2, UPI-2, GNS-1)
 Dave Duerson, Notre Dame (FWAA)
 Leonard Smith, McNeese State (GNS-1)
 Keith Bostic, Michigan (AP-2, UPI-2)
 Russell Carter, SMU (AP-2)
 Gill Byrd, San Jose State (GNS-2)
 Vince Newsome, Washington (GNS-2)
 Joey Browner, USC (AP-3, GNS-2)
 Mike Williams, Army (AP-3)

Special teams

Kickers 

 Chuck Nelson, Washington (AFCA, AP-1, FWAA, UPI-1, GNS-1, NEA, TSN, WC)
 Fuad Reveiz, Tennessee (AP-2, GNS-2)
 Paul Woodside, West Virginia (AP-3, UPI-2)
 Mike Bass, Illinois (GNS-3)
 Kevin Butler, Georgia (GNS-3)

Punters 

 Jim Arnold, Vanderbilt (AFCA, AP-1, FWAA, UPI-1, FN, GNS-2, NEA, TSN)
 Reggie Roby, Iowa (AP-3, UPI-2, GNS-3, WC)
 Jim Colquitt, Tennessee (GNS-1)
 Bucky Scribner, Kansas (AP-2)

Returners 

 Willie Gault, Tennessee (FWAA)

Key 

 Bold – Consensus All-American
 -1 – First-team selection
 -2 – Second-team selection
 -3 – Third-team selection
 CFHOF = College Football Hall of Fame inductee

Official selectors

 AFCA – American Football Coaches Association
 AP – Associated Press
 FWAA – Football Writers Association of America
 UPI – United Press International

Other selectors

 FN – Football News
 GNS – Gannett News Service
 NEA – Newspaper Enterprise Association "picked from a consensus poll of coaches, writers and pro scouts by syndicated columnist Murray Olderman"
 TSN – The Sporting News
 WC – Walter Camp Football Foundation

See also
 1982 All-Big Eight Conference football team
 1982 All-Big Ten Conference football team
 1982 All-Pacific-10 Conference football team
 1982 All-SEC football team

References 

All-America Team
College Football All-America Teams